Live in a Dive is a recording of live material from the New York City hardcore punk band, Sick of It All. It is part of a Fat Wreck Chords series of Live in a Dive albums, this one being released in August, 2002.

Track listing
All tracks written by Sick of It All, unless stated otherwise
"Good Lookin' Out" –   2:14
"Call to Arms" –  1:45
"Blown Away" –  2:37
"Built to Last" –   1:53
"Just Look Around" –  2:43
"Let Go" –  1:09
"Us Vs. Them" –   3:07
"The Bland Within" –  2:39
"Disco Sucks Fuck Everything" –  2:11
"Injustice System!" –  1:46
"Potential for a Fall" –  2:45
"Scratch the Surface" –   2:39
"America" –  2:22
"Straight Ahead" (Carroll, Setari) – 2:19
"Rat Pack" –  2:01
"Sanctuary" –  1:49
"My Life" –  0:55
"Busted" –   1:30
"Maladjusted" –   2:56
"Goatless" –   1:29
"Friends Like You" –  1:41
"Clobberin' Time" –  0:53
"Step Down" –   3:29
"Bullshit Justice" – 2:10? (vinyl release only)

Tracks 1, 4, 7 and 18 originally recorded for Built to Last (1997)
Tracks 2, 6, 11 and 16 originally recorded for Call to Arms (1999)
Tracks 3, 8, 9 and 13 originally recorded for Yours Truly (2000)
Track 5 originally recorded for Just Look Around (1992)
Tracks 10, 15, 17, 21, 22 and 24 originally recorded for Blood, Sweat and No Tears (1989)
Tracks 12, 19, 20 and 23 originally recorded for Scratch the Surface (1994)

Credits
Lou Koller – vocals
Pete Koller – guitar
Craig Setari – bass guitar
Armand Majidi – drums
Recorded at Bottom of the Hill, San Francisco, California, US
Engineered by Ryan Greene

References

External links
Fat Wreck Chords album page

2002 live albums
Fat Wreck Chords Live in a Dive series
Sick of It All albums